Eupetale is a genus of leaf beetles in the subfamily Eumolpinae. It contains two species known from South America.

The original name used for this genus was Lycaste Gistel, 1848, which was later found to be an unnecessary new replacement name for Chalcophana. Additionally, Lycaste Gistel, 1848 is a junior homonym of Lycaste Gistel, 1834 in Buprestidae (a synonym of Polycesta), and Lycaste Agassiz, 1846 in Crustacea (an emendation of Lycesta Savigny, 1816, which is a synonym of Leucothoe). In 2021, Flowers proposed a new name for the genus, Eupetale, for the two species formerly placed in Lycaste Gistel, 1848. Under the name Lycaste, Callicolaspis was formerly considered a synonym of the genus, but in 2003 Callicolaspis was restored as a separate genus.

Species
The genus contains only two species:
 Eupetale eumolpoides (Lefèvre, 1877)
 Eupetale trichoa (Gistel, 1848) (Synonym: Prionodera metallica Jacoby, 1884)

References

Eumolpinae
Chrysomelidae genera
Beetles of South America